Muhamed Demiri (born 20 November 1985 in Bern) is a retired footballer. Born in Switzerland, he represented Macedonia at international level.

International career 
In June 2010 Demiri (who is of ethnic Albanian origin) expressed to the sports media that his desire was to play for the Albania national football team, however he then accepted the call from Macedonia.

He made his senior debut for Macedonia in a December 2010 friendly match away against China and has earned a total of 25 caps, scoring no goals. His final international was a November 2014 European Championship qualification match against Slovakia in Skopje.

References

External links
 
 Player profile at football.ch 
 Profile at MacedonianFootball 
 

1985 births
Living people
Swiss men's footballers
Footballers from Bern
Albanian footballers from North Macedonia
Swiss people of Macedonian descent
Swiss people of Albanian descent
Macedonian people of Swiss descent
Association football midfielders
Macedonian footballers
FC Concordia Basel players
FC Thun players
FC St. Gallen players
BSC Old Boys players
FC Schaffhausen players
Swiss Super League players
Macedonian Muslims
North Macedonia international footballers